Kwale is a community of the Ukwuani Speaking people of Delta State, Nigeria and is located within the colonial Warri province.

Kwale is host to oil and gas companies, some of which have presence in different parts of the African city such as a gas flow facility which is situated at Ebedei nearby Umukwata area and another at Ebendo and Umusadege with a pipeline running from Aboh and river Ase creeks.

There are considerations about the establishment of modular refineries within the area.

Kwale is home to the Ukwuani speaking people of Delta State

References

Towns in Delta State
Geography of Nigeria